Volver, Volver is a Mexican ranchera song in Spanish, written in 1972 by Fernando Z. Maldonado and popularized by Vicente Fernández in 1973. It has been covered by the artists Ry Cooder and Nana Mouskouri. It is about lost love. "Volver, volver"  means “to go back, to go back”.

The song is sung by  Harry Dean Stanton in the 2017 movie Lucky.

Meaning 
The lyrics tell of the singer’s broken hearted passion to return to a lover from whom they have parted in the past. Volver means return in Spanish.

Chart performance

See also
List of number-one hits of 1973 (Mexico)

References 

1972 songs
Number-one singles in Mexico
Ranchera songs